USS Acoma (YTB-701/YTM-701) was a Hisada-class district harbor tug built during the end of World War II. She was placed into reserve until 1962, when she was released to the 1st Naval District, where she served as a tugboat for the next 40 years before being disposed of, as excess to Navy needs.

Built in California
Acoma (YTB-701) was laid down on 2 July 1945 at San Pedro, California, by the Bethlehem Shipbuilding; launched on 30 August 1945, delivered to the Navy on 12 March 1946; and placed in the San Diego, California, Group of the Pacific Reserve Fleet.

Post-World War II service
However, the tug was activated in August 1946 for duty in the 1st Naval District. That assignment has kept her busy since then. In February 1962, Acoma was reclassified a medium harbor tug and was redesignated YTM-701.

Final decommissioning
 
She concluded almost 40 years of service in December 1985 when she was placed out of service. Her name was struck from the Naval Vessel Register at the same time, and she was subsequently transferred to some unspecified other agency.

References
 

 

Cold War auxiliary ships of the United States
Tugs of the United States Navy
Ships built in Los Angeles
1945 ships